Stupini may refer to several villages in Romania:

 Stupini, a village in Sânmihaiu de Câmpie Commune, Bistrița-Năsăud County
 Stupini, a village in Hida Commune, Sălaj County
 Stupinii Prejmerului, a village in Prejmer Commune, Brașov County